The Caracalla Dance Theatre is a dance company based in Beirut, Lebanon.

History
In 1968, Abdul Halim Caracalla founded what would evolve into the first and most prominent professional dance theatre of the Middle East, creating a body language based upon the Martha Graham dance disciplines blended with Arabic heritage, thus creating a unique "Caracalla Dance Style".

The Caracalla Dance Theatre has performed in the most reputable theatres and cultural cities across the world, from the Osaka National Theatre, to the Carnegie Hall, Sadler's Wells to the Kennedy Centre, Théâtre des Champs-Élysées to the Frankfurt Opera House, Rio de Janeiro and São Paulo Opera Houses, Centre of the Arts Los Angeles to Places des Arts Montreal, as well as numerous other festivals and venues worldwide. Caracalla captured global press recognition interpreted through an original dance form and revealing a rich and mysterious east blended with western technique.

Recipient of numerous awards and decorations from Arabic and International leaders, Caracalla has the honour to collaborate with some of the most internationally renowned artists that are pioneers and leaders in the world of theatre. Under the auspices of great leaders and with the admiration of a vast audience, the Company has succeeded in the establishment of its own theatre home to the dancers and guardian to over forty years of extensive archival research in dance, music, costumes, traditions and Arabic heritage. Theatre is also home to the Caracalla Dance School, a dance school teaching today's youth for an artistic future.

Performances
Caracalla created over 18 ballets and musicals including adaptations of Shakespeare's A Midsummer Night’s Dream, Taming of the Shrew and Much Ado About Nothing.

Today, Tomorrow, Yesterday – (1972): Osaka International Fair, Beirut, Moscow, Yerevan, Duchanbe, Baku, Tashkent, Farunzi, Abidjan, Sierra- Leone, Safado, Morovia, Freetown, Teheran.
Bizarre of the Miracle – (1974): Beirut, Moscow, Leningrad, Kiev, Baghdad, Carthage International Festival, Hammamet, Kayrawan, Kuwait, United Arab Emirates.
Black Tents – (1978): Qatar, Amman, Rabat, Beirut, Damascus International fair, Bagdad, Algeria Tour, Carthage International Festival and Tour, London – Sadler's Wells, Norwich, Paris - Theatre Des Champs Elysees, Kuwait, Amman, New York - Carnegie Hall, Washington DC - Kennedy Centre, Houston, Detroit, São Paulo, Rio de Janeiro, BellasHorizontes, Abu Dhabi.
Shot of Glory – (1980): Qatar, Damascus International fair, Kuwait, London Sadler's Wells, Norwich, United Arab Emirates.
Oriental Taming of the Shrew – (1982): Theatre De Liban, Qatar, Beirut - Picadilly, Dubai, Abu Dhabi, London – Sadler's Wells, Moscow, Leningrad, Kiev, Ottawa, Montreal, Toronto, International Festival of Carthage and Tour, La Cite Theatre (Lebanon), Algeria - Tour, Damascus International Fair, Tripoli (Libya), Benghazi, Spain, Beittedine International Art Festival (Lebanon), Sierra Leone, Abidjan, Liberia.
Echoes – (1985): Qatar Foundation, Ceremonial Court, Casino Du Liban, Algeria, Kennedy Centre Opera House, Washington DC.
Oriental Midsummer’s Night Dream – (1990): Beirut, Cairo Opera House, London, Montreal, Jerash International Festival, Paris, Abu Dhabi, Dubai, Oman, Abidjan.
Elissa Queen of Carthage – (1995): International Festival of Carthage, Damascus Palais Des Congres, Beirut Ivoire Theatre, Dubai, Jerash International Festival, Cairo Opera House, London - Sadler's Wells, Abu Dhabi, Dubai, Kuwait, Oman, Malaysia, Washington DC Kennedy Centre, Montreal, Ottawa, Biennale de la Danse in Lyon, São Paulo Opera House, Rio de Janeiro Opera House, Palais Des Congres Abidjan.
Andalusia, The Lost Glory – (1997): International Festival of Baalbeck, Festival Tour of Sicily, Beirut Ivoire Theatre, Cairo Opera House, United Arab Emirates, Kuwait, Oman, Bahrain, Palais Des Congres Abidjan Ivory Coast, Monte Carlo, London - Sadler's Wells.
Bilaylet Qamar – (1999): Baalbeck International Festival, Casino du Liban, Ivoire theatre, Dubai, Algeria, Souk Ukaz International Festival-Jordan, Las Vegas Mandalay Bay.
Two Thousand & One Nights – (2002): Dubai Media City, Baalbeck International Festival, Abu Dhabi National Theatre, Place des Arts Montreal, Beirut, Sadler's Wells Peacock Theatre, Algeria, Sporting of Monte Carlo, Frankfurt Opera House, Beijing International Theatre, Shanghai World Expo, China.
Knights of the Moon – (2007): Qatar Foundation, Ceremonial Court, Casino Du Liban, Algeria, Kennedy Centre Opera House, Washington DC.
Zayed and the Dream – (2008): National Theatre, Abu Dhabi, Forum De Beyrouth, Le Palai des Congres de Paris, London Coliseum,  Dubai Palladium, Kennedy Center Washington DC, Royce Hall Los Angeles (UCLA)
Villager’s Opera – (2009): Baalbeck International Festival,  Djamila Festival, Theatre Caracalla Beirut.
Kan Ya Ma Kan – (2012): Beiteddine Art Festival, Royal Opera House of Muscat, Djamila Festival, Caracalla Dance Theater, National Centre for the Performing Arts Beijing (NCPA)
Sailing Through Time – (2016): 60 years anniversary of the Baalbeck International Festival, Forum de Beyrouth, National Centre for the Performing Arts Beijing (NCPA)

Press reviews
"We in the West, love to think we are culturally far more sophisticated than the East, but for pure splendor ingrained with soul, Caracalla is an unprecedented joy." (Dance Europe, UK)

"I doubt the London stage has seen such textile beauty, such opulent headdresses, such marvels clashes of brocade and braid. Caracalla Dance Theatre have made their own bridge between East and West. Set ebulliently to Ravel's Bolero which sounds better than usual when played on Arabian instruments… better 2001 Caracallas than one Béjart". (Daily Telegraph, UK)

"These are people who don't want to imitate anyone". (L’Humanité , France)
 
"Dream a little dream of dance; Lavish, energetic and spectacular!" (The Stage, Germany)

"Caracalla Dance Theatre's played to standing-room only crowds over the weekend at the Kennedy Centre… In fact, the stage has never sparkled and throbbed as the Opera House did at Saturday's performance by this entrancing Lebanese troupe… Clearly, it's good to be king of the musical theatre world in the Middle East". (The Washington Post, USA)

"The company of dancers dressed in Abdel Halim Caracalla's fabulous costumes, stomped their way into our hearts by loving every minute of it. 2 Stars for Boris Eifman's Red Giselle, 3 Stars for Caracalla's Thousand and One Nights". (Sunday Express, UK)

"A contemporary dance form that blend the great of the Orient with the earthiness of Western modern dance… A new language of movement which fuses modern Western Traditions". (Evening Standard, UK)

"A performance with strong and shrill flavors, like the hues of the sky and the nature that makes Lebanon a credible hypothesis of the terrestrial paradise. The remarkable technique of dance acquired by the company of professionals, a natural harmony that links the dozens of ballerina present, involved in choreography; The result is a show of great emotional impact". (Il Meeting Notiziario, Italy)

"Caracalla Family, the driving force behind the Middle East's leading dance theatre… the dancers skim over the stage in one breath of surging humanity – we'd give our teeth to join in…" (Dance Europe)

"Costumes are sumptuous, with fabrics and designs sourced from all over the Arab world by Caracalla; every costume is handmade and unique, and shimmers with vibrant colours; dance sections by the company are infectious". (Sunday Telegraph, UK)

References

External links
official website

 Theatres in Lebanon
 Dance companies